Westhausen station is a railway stop in the municipality of Westhausen, located in the Ostalbkreis district in Baden-Württemberg, Germany. The station lies on the Ries Railway. The train services are operated by Go-Ahead Bayern.

References 

Railway stations in Baden-Württemberg
Buildings and structures in Ostalbkreis